Endothenia nephelopsycha is a species of moth of the family Tortricidae. It is found in Uganda.

References

Endemic fauna of Uganda
Moths described in 1934
Endotheniini